Lisa Wedeen is Professor of Political Science and the College and Co-Director of the Chicago Center for Contemporary Theory at the University of Chicago. In 1995, Wedeen received her Ph.D. in political science at the University of California, Berkeley. Her former advisor is Hanna Pitkin. She has taught courses on nationalism, identity formation, power and resistance, and citizenship. Her work on the Middle East includes Ambiguities of Domination, an ethnographic study of the culture of the spectacle in Syria under Hafez al-Assad.

Selected publications
 "Acting "As If": Symbolic Politics and Social Control in Syria" (1998)
 "Ambiguities of Domination: Politics, Rhetoric, and Symbols in Contemporary Syria" (University of Chicago Press, 1999)
 "Concepts and Commitments in the Study of Democracy" in Problems and Methods in the Study of Politics (2004)
 "Conceptualizing Culture: Possibilities For Political Science In "APSR" (2002)
 "Ethnography as an Interpretive Enterprise" (2009) 
"Ideology and Humor in Dark Times: Notes from Syria" (2013)
 Peripheral Visions: Politics, Power, and Performance in Yemen (University of Chicago Press, 2008)
 "Reflections on Ethnographic Work in Political Science" (2010)
"Seeing Like a Citizen, Acting Like a State: Exemplary Events in Unified Yemen" in Comparative Studies in Society and History (2003)

References

External links
 Webpage on University of Chicago website
 Article in Vol 27 No. 18 of The University of Chicago Chronicle

Year of birth missing (living people)
Living people
UC Berkeley College of Letters and Science alumni
University of Chicago faculty
American women political scientists
American political scientists
American women academics
21st-century American women